Alfred Hawthorne "Benny" Hill (21 January 1924 – 20 April 1992) was an English comedian, actor, singer and writer. He is remembered for his television programme The Benny Hill Show, an amalgam of slapstick, burlesque and double entendre in a format that included live comedy and filmed segments, with Hill at the focus of almost every segment.

Hill was a prominent figure in British television for several decades. His show was among the most-watched programmes in the UK, with the audience peaking at more than 21 million in 1971. The Benny Hill Show was also exported to many countries around the world. He received a BAFTA Television Award for Best Writer and a Rose d'Or, and was nominated for the BAFTA for Best Entertainment Performance and two Emmy Awards for Outstanding Variety. In 2006, Hill was voted by the British public number 17 in ITV's poll of TV's 50 Greatest Stars.

Outside television, Hill starred in films including the Ealing comedy Who Done It? (1956), Chitty Chitty Bang Bang (1968) and The Italian Job (1969). His comedy song "Ernie (The Fastest Milkman in the West)" was 1971's Christmas number one on the UK Singles Chart and earned Hill an Ivor Novello Award from the British Academy of Songwriters, Composers and Authors in 1972.

Early life 
Alfred Hawthorne Hill was born on 21 January 1924 in Southampton, Hampshire. His father, Alfred Hill (1893–1972), later manager of a surgical appliance shop, and grandfather, Henry Hill (born 1871), had both been circus clowns. His mother was Helen (née Cave; 1894–1976).

After leaving Taunton's School in Southampton, Hill worked at Woolworths and as a milkman, a bridge operator, a driver and a drummer before becoming assistant stage manager with a touring revue. He was called up in 1942 and trained as a mechanic in the Royal Electrical and Mechanical Engineers, British Army. He served as a mechanic, truck driver and searchlight operator in Normandy after September 1944 and later transferred to the Combined Services Entertainment division before the end of the war.

Inspired by the "star comedians" of British music hall shows, Hill set out to make his mark in show business. He took on the nickname of "Benny" in homage to his favourite comedian, Jack Benny.

Career 
After the Second World War, Hill worked as a performer on radio, making his debut on Variety Bandbox on 5 October 1947. His first appearance on television was in 1950. In addition, he attempted a sitcom anthology, Benny Hill, which ran from 1962 to 1963, in which he played a different character in each episode. In 1964, he played Nick Bottom in an all-star TV film production of William Shakespeare's A Midsummer Night's Dream. He also had a radio programme lasting for three series called Benny Hill Time on BBC Radio's Light Programme, from 1964 to 1966. It was a topical show; for example, a March 1964 episode featured James Pond, 0017, in "From Moscow with Love" and his version of The Beatles. He played a number of characters in the series, such as Harry Hill and Fred Scuttle.

Films and recordings 
Hill appeared in five full-length feature films—Who Done It? (1956), Light Up the Sky! (1960), Those Magnificent Men in Their Flying Machines (1965), Chitty Chitty Bang Bang (1968) and The Italian Job (1969). He also made two short-subject films—The Waiters (1969) and Eddie in August (1970)—the latter being a TV production. Finally, a clip-show film spin-off of his early Thames Television shows (1969–1973), called The Best of Benny Hill (1974), was a theatrically released compilation of Benny Hill Show episodes.

Hill's audio recordings include "Gather in the Mushrooms" (1961), "Pepys' Diary" (1961), "Transistor Radio" (1961), "Harvest of Love" (1963) and "Ernie (The Fastest Milkman in the West)", which was the UK Singles Chart Christmas number-one single in 1971. He received an Ivor Novello Award from the British Academy of Songwriters, Composers and Authors in 1972.

The Benny Hill Show 

Hill had struggled on stage and had uneven success in radio, but in television he found a medium that played to his strengths. The Benny Hill Show had a music hall-derived format combining live on-stage comedy and filmed segments, and its humour relied on slapstick, innuendo and parody. Recurring players on his show during the BBC years included Patricia Hayes, Jeremy Hawk, Peter Vernon, Ronnie Brody and his co-writer from the early 1950s to early 1960s, Dave Freeman. Short, bald Jackie Wright was a frequent supporting player who in many sketches had to put up with Hill slapping him on the top of his head.

Hill remained mostly with the BBC through to 1968, except for a few sojourns with ITV and ATV stations between 1957 and 1960 and again in 1967. In 1969, his show moved from the BBC to Thames Television, where it remained until its cancellation in 1989, with an erratic schedule of one-hour specials. The series showcased Hill's talents as an imaginative writer, comic performer and impressionist. He may have bought scripts from various comedy writers, but if so, they never received an onscreen credit (some evidence indicates he bought a script from one of his regular cast members in 1976, Cherri Gilham, to whom he wrote from Spain, telling her he was using her "Fat Lady" idea on the show in January 1977).

The most common running gag in Hill's shows was the closing sequence, the "run-off", which was literally a running gag in featuring various members of the cast chasing Hill, along with other stock comedy characters such as policemen, vicars and old women. This was commonly filmed using "under-cranking" camera techniques and included other comic features such as jogging instead of a run at full speed and characters running off one side of the screen and reappearing running on from the other. The tune used in all the chases, Boots Randolph's "Yakety Sax", is so strongly associated with the show that it is commonly referred to as "The Benny Hill Theme". It has been used as a form of parody in many ways by television shows and films. In a 2015 UK-wide poll the show's theme song was voted number 1 on the ITV special The Sound of ITV – The Nation's Favourite Theme Tune.

From the start of the 1980s, the show featured a troupe of attractive young women, known collectively as "Hill's Angels". They would appear either on their own in a dance sequence or in character as foils against Hill. Sue Upton was one of the longest-serving members of the Angels. Jane Leeves appeared, as well. Henry McGee and Bob Todd joined Jackie Wright as comic supporting players, and the later shows also featured "Hill's Little Angels", a group of cute children including the families of Dennis Kirkland (the show's director) and Sue Upton. Jenny Lee-Wright (who first appeared on Hill's show in 1970) earned the nickname "The Sexiest Stooge" – coined by Hill.

The alternative comedian Ben Elton made a headline-grabbing allegation, both on the TV show Saturday Live and in the pages of Q magazine (in its January 1987 issue), that The Benny Hill Show incited crimes and misdemeanours. "We know in Britain, women can't even walk safe in a park anymore. That, for me, is worrying." A writer in The Independent newspaper, though, opined that Elton's assault was "like watching an elderly uncle being kicked to death by young thugs". GQ magazine stated, "pompous and portentous as this is, blaming Hill for rape statistics is like pointing a finger at concert pianists for causing elephant poaching". Elton later parodied himself in Harry Enfield & Chums as Benny Elton, a politically correct spoilsport, in which Elton ends up being chased by angry women, accompanied by the "Yakety Sax" theme, after trying to force them to be more feminist. A spokesman for the Broadcasting Standards Council commented that "the convention is becoming increasingly offensive ]...] It's not as funny as it was to have half-naked girls chased across the screen by a dirty old man."

In late May 1989, Hill announced that after 21 years with Thames Television he was quitting and taking a year off. His shows had earned Thames £26 million, with a large percentage due to the success of his shows in the United States. John Howard Davies, the head of Light Entertainment at Thames Television, was cited by the British press as the man who sacked Benny Hill when the company decided not to renew Hill's contract. "The show was past its sell-by date", Davies told The Guardian newspaper. "Benny was all right when he was young, but when you're in your 60s, it's a slightly different matter to leer at a pretty girl."

In 1991, Hill started work on a new television series called Benny Hill's World Tour which would see Hill performing his sketches in various places around the world where his show had become popular. However, Hill only managed to record one special called Greetings from New York (with regular cast members such as Henry McGee, Bob Todd and Sue Upton), with the show becoming billed as "his final TV appearance" when released onto DVD.

In February 1992, Thames Television, which received a steady stream of requests from viewers for The Benny Hill Show repeats, finally gave in and put together a number of re-edited shows. Hill died on the same day that a new contract arrived in the post from Central Independent Television, for which he was to have made a series of specials. He had turned down competing offers from Carlton and Thames.

Celebrity fans 

Johnny Carson and sidekick Ed McMahon were both fans of Hill and tried several times to get him to travel to Los Angeles and be a guest on Carson's The Tonight Show.

Radio and TV host Adam Carolla said that he was a fan of Hill and that he considered Hill "as American as The Beatles". During an episode of The Man Show, Carolla performed in what was billed as a tribute to "our favourite Englishman, Sir Benny Hill" (Hill was never knighted) in more risqué versions of some of the sketches. Carolla played a rude and lecherous waiter, a typical Hill role, and the sketch featured many of the staples of Hill's shows, including a Jackie Wright-esque bald man, as well as the usual scantily clad women.

Michael Jackson was a Hill fan: "I just love your Benny Hill," the young Jackson told a bemused British music-press critic during a 1970s tour, "he's so funny!". In 1987, Genesis filmed a video for their song "Anything She Does", featuring Hill as his character Fred Scuttle, an incompetent security guard who lets a ridiculous number of fans backstage at a Genesis concert. In a June 2011 interview with The Observer, the rapper Snoop Dogg declared himself to be a fan of Hill.

In the Omnibus episode Benny Hill – Clown Imperial filmed shortly before his death, celebrities such as Burt Reynolds, Michael Caine, John Mortimer, Mickey Rooney and Walter Cronkite, among others, expressed their appreciation of and admiration for Hill and his humour — and in Reynolds' case, the appreciation extended to the Hill's Angels, as well. The novelist Anthony Burgess made no secret of his admiration for Hill. Burgess, whose novels were often comic, relished language, wordplay and dialect, admired the verbal and comedic skill that underlay Hill's success. Reviewing a biography of Hill, Saucy Boy, in The Guardian in 1990, Burgess described Hill as "a comic genius steeped in the British music hall tradition" (as were Chaplin and Laurel, two of Hill's childhood idols) and "one of the great artists of our age". A meeting between the two men was described in a newspaper article by Burgess and recalled in the Telegraph newspaper by the satirist Craig Brown.

Personal life 

Hill never owned his own home in London and instead preferred to rent a flat rather than buy one. He rented a double-room apartment on London's Queen's Gate for 26 years until around 1986 when he moved to Fairwater House in Teddington. While looking for somewhere to live, he stayed at 22 Westrow Gardens in Southampton.

Despite being a millionaire, he continued with the frugal habits that he picked up from his parents, such as buying cheap food at supermarkets, walking for miles rather than paying for a taxi unless someone picked up the tab for a limousine, and regularly patching and mending the same clothes.

Hill never married and he had no children. He had proposed to two women, but neither accepted. Shortly after his death in 1992, actress Annette Andre said that she turned down his proposal of marriage in the early 1960s. Rumours circulated that he was gay, but he always denied them.

Hill was a Francophile and enjoyed visits to France, including to Marseille, where until the 1980s, he could go to outdoor cafes anonymously, travelling on public transport and socialising with local women. He spoke French fluently and also knew basic German, Spanish, Dutch and Italian. Foreign travel was the only luxury that he permitted himself, and even then, he would stay in modest accommodation.

Death 

Hill's health declined in the late 1980s and after working for Thames Television. After a mild heart attack on 24 February 1992, doctors recommended him a heart bypass. He declined, and a week later was found to have kidney failure. Hill died at his flat in Teddington on 20 April 1992, at the age of 68, but was not found until two days later, following several days of unanswered telephone calls. He was in his armchair in front of the television. The cause of death was recorded as coronary thrombosis. Hill was buried at Hollybrook Cemetery, near his birthplace in Southampton, on 28 April 1992.Daily Mirror - page 5 - 29 April 1992

Probate was granted on Hill's estate in London on 5 June, 1992, when its value at the time of his death was given as £7,548,192,  . Writing his will three decades before his death, he left the bulk of his estate to his parents, who had predeceased him; ultimately, Hill's estate was divided among his seven nieces and nephews.

During the night of 4 October 1992, following speculation in the media that Hill had been buried with a large amount of gold and jewellery, grave robbers excavated the grave at Hollybrook Cemetery and broke open the coffin, the open grave being noticed by a passer-by the following morning. After a police examination of the scene, the coffin was re-closed and the grave filled back in by cemetery workers, and as a security measure, a -thick concrete slab was placed over it.

Legacy 

In 1998, Channel 4 featured Hill in one of its Heroes of Comedy programmes. In 2002, D. J. Taylor of The Independent ranked him the third greatest British comedian of the 20th century after Charlie Chaplin and Stan Laurel.

On 28 December 2006, Channel 4 broadcast the documentary Is Benny Hill Still Funny? The programme featured an audience that comprised a cross-section of young adults who had little or no knowledge of Hill, to discover whether his comedy was valid to a generation that enjoyed the likes of Little Britain, The Catherine Tate Show and Borat. The participants favourably rated a 30-minute compilation that included examples of Hill's humour from his BBC and ITV shows.

In November 2021, That's TV announced that The Benny Hill Show would feature in its Christmas schedule alongside other ITV programmes like Beadle's About and Kenny Everett's New Year Specials. In addition to operating a number of local television channels on Freeview, That's TV has another national slot on channel 65, meaning that Hill's show would be seen in full, nationwide on British television for the first time in nearly 20 years.

References

Book sources 
 Hill, Leonard. Saucy Boy: The Life Story of Benny Hill. London: Grafton, 1990 (hardcover); . London: Grafton/HarperCollins, 1991 (paperback); .
 Kirkland, Dennis, with Hillary Bonner. The Strange and Saucy World of Benny Hill. London: Blake Publishing, 2002 (paperback): .
 Lewisohn, Mark. Funny, Peculiar: The True Story of Benny Hill. London: Sidgwick & Jackson/Pan Macmillan, 2002 (hardcover); . London: Pan Books Ltd, 2003 (paperback); .
 Smith, John. The Benny Hill Story. "With a Foreword by Bob Monkhouse" (British edition). London: W.H. Allen, 1988 (hardcover); . "With a Foreword by Bob Hope" (U.S. edition). New York: St. Martin's Press, 1989 (hardcover); .

External links 

 
 
 
 
 
 
 
 The Eastleigh Photograph Archive Photos of the dairy and streets where Benny worked as a milkman, inspiring the song "Ernie (The Fastest Milkman in the West)"
 The Benny Hill Songbook Lyrics, guitar chords and transcripts
 Benny Hill Sings? Benny Hill's 1965 debut LP on Pye records
 BBC Hampshire BBC article on Benny Hill's Hampshire connections
 Benny's Place featuring Louise English & Hill's Angels
 What Happened to Benny Hill, a short YouTube biography

1924 births
1992 deaths
Military personnel from Southampton
Burials in Hampshire
20th-century English comedians
20th-century English male actors
20th-century English musicians
British Army personnel of World War II
British male comedy actors
British novelty song performers
British sketch comedians
Burials at Hollybrook Cemetery
Deaths from coronary thrombosis
English comedy musicians
English male comedians
English male film actors
English male television actors
Male actors from Southampton
Obscenity controversies in television
People educated at Bournemouth School
Pye Records artists
Royal Electrical and Mechanical Engineers soldiers
Slapstick comedians